Jack Hody Johnson (born May 18, 1975) is an American singer-songwriter, filmmaker, and former professional surfer. Johnson is known primarily for his work in the soft rock and acoustic pop genres. In 2001, he achieved commercial success after the release of his debut album, Brushfire Fairytales. Johnson has reached number one on the Billboard 200 chart with his albums Sing-A-Longs and Lullabies for the Film Curious George in 2006, Sleep Through the Static in 2008, To the Sea in 2010 and From Here to Now to You in 2013. His album In Between Dreams peaked at number two on the chart in 2005 and again in 2013.

Johnson is active in environmentalism and sustainability, often with a focus on the world's oceans. Johnson and his wife Kim created the Johnson Ohana Charitable Foundation and the Kōkua Hawaii Foundation. In 2008, Johnson adopted the concept of greening (reduce and reuse), and donated 100% of the proceeds of the Sleep Through the Static tour to the Johnson Ohana Charitable Foundation. Similarly, the proceeds from the 2010 To the Sea album tour went to All at Once, a Johnson-backed collaboration of greening charities promoting fan involvement.

Early life 
The son of well-known surfer Jeff Johnson, Jack was born and raised on the North Shore of Oahu, Hawaii. He began to learn how to surf at the age of 5. At 17, he became the youngest invitee to make the finals of the Pipeline Masters, one of surfing's most prestigious events, on Oahu's North Shore. One week later, however, his stint as a professional surfer ended when he suffered a surfing accident at the Pipeline that put more than 100 stitches in his forehead and removed a few of his teeth; this later became the inspiration for the song "Drink the Water". He appeared as a surfer in The Endless Summer II in 1994.

Jack Johnson graduated from Kahuku High School on the island of Oahu. He would later attend the University of California, Santa Barbara, and graduated in 1997 with a B.A. in film studies. While Johnson learned the guitar at the age of 8 and started songwriting at the age of 12, his passion for music grew when he played rhythm guitar for the band Soil (not to be confused with the heavy metal band of the same name) in college. In 1994, Zach Gill's band, Django Reinhardt, released a CD that quickly made Django a favorite band of the Isla Vista party scene at UCSB. Django was the rival of Jack Johnson's band Soil, but Gill and Johnson developed a strong friendship, eventually becoming bandmates in later years. While with Soil at UCSB, Johnson opened for acts such as Sublime and Dave Matthews who were then relatively unknown bands.

Johnson credits his songwriting influences as Bob Dylan, Jimi Hendrix, Radiohead, Otis Redding, G. Love and Special Sauce, Ben Harper, Sublime, The Beatles, Bob Marley, Neil Young, and A Tribe Called Quest. Johnson names Jimi Hendrix as his all-time favorite guitarist.

Career

2000–2003: Brushfire Fairytales and On and On 
Jack Johnson's big break was writing and contributing vocals for the song "Rodeo Clowns" which was featured on G. Love's 1999 album Philadelphonic. The song would later become the most famous single on the album. Johnson was introduced to G. Love by a mutual friend of Johnson who was shooting surf films with him at the time. After hearing "Rodeo Clowns", G. Love saw Johnson's potential and effortless style and invited him to record with him. That led to the now-famous "Rodeo Clowns" recording, launching Johnson's career.

In addition to his later success as a musician, Johnson is also an accomplished filmmaker. Johnson directed the surf films Thicker Than Water (2000) and The September Sessions (2002), in which he also starred. Both movie soundtracks were also products of Johnson. Johnson also starred in the 2004 surf film A Brokedown Melody.

Suela released a four track demo that caught the attention of Ben Harper's producer, J. P. Plunier, who worked with Johnson to produce his debut album Brushfire Fairytales during December 2000 with Harper and his Weissenborn lap steel guitar making a guest appearance. Brushfire Fairytales was released on February 1, 2001, and led to Johnson becoming the opening act in late February 2001 for the last twenty-three cities of Ben Harper's "Innocent Criminals" tour of the United States.

Johnson went back into the studio with Adam Topol (drums, percussion) and Merlo Podlewski (bass), who played on Brushfire Fairytales, and Mario Caldato Jr on production duties, to record his second full-length album On and On. It was the first album to be recorded at Johnson's Mango Tree Studio in Johnson's home town of North Shore, Oahu, and the first to be released through The Moonshine Conspiracy Records. On and On was released on May 6, 2003.

The Moonshine Conspiracy Records was later changed to Brushfire Records; Johnson turned the offices and studios of his Los-Angeles based record company into a model of eco-friendliness, with solar power, recyclable CD packaging, and power-saving air conditioners.

2004–2009: In Between Dreams, Curious George, and Sleep Through the Static 

On April 3, 2004, Johnson and Ben Harper performed with Toots and the Maytals on Saturday Night Live (season 29, episode 16).

In October 2004, Johnson returned to the Mango Tree Studio with Topol and Podlewski along with Zach Gill (of Animal Liberation Orchestra) playing accordion, melodica and piano, to record his follow-up to 2003's On and On. In Between Dreams was released on March 1, 2005.

Sing-A-Longs and Lullabies for the Film Curious George is a soundtrack album by Johnson, released on February 7, 2006. The album also features Ben Harper, G. Love, Merlo Podlewski and Zach Gill. It was the first soundtrack to make it to number 1 since the Bad Boys II soundtrack in August 2003, and was the first soundtrack for an animated film to top the Billboard 200 since the Pocahontas soundtrack in July 1995.

Johnson enlisted J.P. Plunier to produce his fourth full-length studio album, Sleep Through the Static. It was recorded using 100% solar energy at the Solar-Powered Plastic Plant studio in Los Angeles. The album featured Gill (keys), Podlewski (bass) and Topol (drums, percussion). Sleep Through the Static was released on February 1, 2008, and was followed by a world tour.

A live album and DVD of Johnson's 2008 world tour, entitled En Concert, was released on October 27, 2009. The DVD was directed by Emmett Malloy.

Johnson was the headliner for the Friday night of the 2008 Cochella Valley Music and Arts Festival. 

Johnson spearheaded the Kōkua Festivals (2004–2008 and 2010).  Often occurring around Earth Day, these six years of festivals provided support for the Kōkua Hawai'i Foundation, which is a charitable organization that supports environmental education in the schools and communities of Hawaii.  Kōkua Festival 2004/2005 was a DVD released by Jack Johnson Music that showcased the early Kōkua Festivals.  He also participated, with Willie Nelson, Jackson Browne, Dave Matthews, Eddie Vedder and others, in the documentary Kōkua 2008: 5 Years of Change (2009), produced by Brushfire and Three Foot Giant Productions and shown on Sundance Channel. On April 17, 2012, preceding his 2012 Hawaiian Islands tour, he released the live Kōkua Festival compilation Best of Kōkua Festival.

Johnson produced Animal Liberation Orchestra's fifth studio album, Man of the World, which was released February 9, 2010. The album also features vocals from Johnson.

2010–2011: To the Sea 
On February 1, 2010, Johnson's official website announced that his fifth studio album, To the Sea, was in the recording process at the Mango Tree Studio, with a planned worldwide release during the first week of June 2010. The website also announced an accompanying European, Australian and New Zealand tour to coincide with the album's release on midnight May 31.

The first single from To the Sea was "You and Your Heart", released on April 6, 2010.

While speaking with New Zealand radio station ZM, Johnson said he is constantly aiming to build relationships with local pro-environment, non-profit groups. "We try to raise money for a lot of these groups who are doing positive things in the community. We try to focus mostly on environmental education, just trying to get kids out into nature, supporting local farms and things like that."

Johnson embarked on a world tour in 2010 with Paula Fuga, a Hawaiian vocalist and ukulele player, performing at a range of venues across the world including Europe, New Zealand, Australia, Canada, U.S., and Japan.

On November 1, 2011, Johnson released a stand-alone single called "In The Morning" featuring Paula Fuga and John Cruz.

2012: Hawaiian Islands tour 

On February 22, 2012, Jack with John Cruz and Paula Fuga announced a 7-show acoustic tour of the Hawaiian Islands during April.

At the Stan Sheriff Center on April 14, 2012, during the Pillars of Peace Hawai'i: Building Peace on a Foundation of Aloha, Johnson performed introductory music before Nobel Peace Laureate Tenzin Gyatso, the 14th Dalai Lama of Tibet, gave the speech "Educating the Heart".  Better Together was one of several songs Jack performed.

2013–2018: Bonnaroo, From Here to Now to You, and All the Light Above It Too 
Johnson released From Here to Now to You with his band on September 17, 2013. On June 15, 2013, Jack and the Band performed as headliners at the 2013 Bonnaroo in Tennessee. He also played two acoustic concerts, one at London's Tabernacle in Notting Hill and the other at New York City's Allen Room at Lincoln Center overlooking Central Park, featuring songs from his upcoming album. The From Here to Now to You Tour ran from March through September 2014.

In February 2017, Johnson announced a U.S. tour beginning in Chicago at the Huntington Bank Pavilion on Northerly Island on June 1 and ending with two Kōkua Hawai'i Foundation benefit concerts at the Waikiki Shell on August 4 & 5. Also, he revealed plans to release an album in the summer 2017. Later, he added a September 10 concert for the 2017 Ohana Fest at Doheny State Beach, Dana Point, California. On September 8, 2017, Jack released his seventh studio album All the Light Above It Too, and peaked at number 13 on the Billboard chart's "Artist 100." In July 2018, Johnson released his greatest hits album "Jack Johnson: The Essentials" in Japan only.

2019–present: This Warm December, Global Citizen and Meet the Moonlight 
In late 2019, Johnson released a single "New Axe", which was featured on the This Warm December Vol. 3 album. He then did a "Together at Home" Instagram Live stream concert on March 28, 2020. His concert was the third most watched on the Global Citizen YouTube. He then also performed at the "One World: Together at Home" special, and a live version of "Better Together" was featured on the One World: Together at Home album. On May 1, 2020, he was featured on Milky Chance's new single "Don't Let Me Down". On September 26, 2020, Johnson performed the opening set at Farm Aid: On the Road.

On December 4, 2020, Johnson released a new single titled "The Captain Is Drunk". On April 16, 2021, Johnson released a song titled "If Ever" with Paula Fuga and Ben Harper. The song appeared on Fuga's new album Rain on Sunday, which will be featured on Johnson's record label.

On June 24th, 2022, Johnson released his eighth studio album, Meet the Moonlight, his first full-length record in five years. It was produced by Blake Mills, engineered by Joseph Lorge, and recorded both in Los Angeles (at Sound City Studios and EastWest Studios) and at The Mango Tree (Johnson's home studio) in Hawaii. The album's lead single is titled "One Step Ahead".

To coincide with his new album release, Johnson embarked on the Meet the Moonlight Tour with 35 stops at major venues across the United States (including Hawaii) and Canada. He was accompanied by various artists including Grammy-award winner (and personal friend) Ziggy Marley. In November, Johnson will tour the album in Australia and New Zealand, his first overseas concerts since 2019.

Personal life 
On July 22, 2000, Johnson married his college girlfriend, Kim Baker. They have three children: two boys and a girl. Johnson lives on the North Shore of the island of Oahu in Hawaii. In an interview with Johnson, Ann Donahue from Billboard described Johnson's family life by saying "There is often trouble in balancing the life of an artist, environmentalist, and family man, but Johnson seems to have the niche for such a challenge. This time around, he's found a pace that agrees with him...bringing his family along so he can spend mornings with them sightseeing." Both Johnson and his wife decline to talk about or release any intimate information concerning their children.

Charity 
In 2008, Johnson and his wife Kim created the Johnson Ohana Charitable Foundation, a non-profit public charity supporting environmental, art, and music education worldwide. Jack and Kim Johnson also founded the Kokua Hawaii Foundation in 2003. Johnson and his family work hard every year at festivals and concerts alike, to raise money for causes they feel are most important. Johnson recorded a cover of John Lennon's "Imagine" for the 2007 benefit album Instant Karma: The Amnesty International Campaign to Save Darfur, which was also included on the 2009 benefit album Rhythms del Mundo Classics. In talking about Johnson and his career choices, Rolling Stone wrote: "It is a typically generous move from Johnson, who has used his multi-platinum success to support causes he cares about." Although the Johnson Ohana Charitable Foundation is a non-profit organization that "focuses on environmental, arts and music education", it has raised more than $750,000 from 2009 to 2010 to give away. Johnson was in Osaka, Japan on his To the Sea 2010 World Tour at the time of the 2011 Tōhoku earthquake and tsunami in northern Japan. He was in a hotel with his family when it struck. After having to postpone the rest of his tour, he donated $50,000 to GlobalGiving's Japan Earthquake and Tsunami Relief Fund.

Johnson's Ohana Charitable Foundation has also supported Little Kids Rock, a national nonprofit that works to restore and revitalize music education in disadvantaged U.S. public schools. He also decorated a guitar for Little Kids Rock to auction to raise funds for its program.

On September 22, 2012, he donated his time to play a few songs at Farm Aid 2012 in Hershey, PA. Later in 2012, Jack donated $50,000 for Hurricane Sandy relief and added links on his website for others to donate:

Discography 

Brushfire Fairytales (2001)
On and On (2003)
In Between Dreams (2005)
Sing-A-Longs and Lullabies for the Film Curious George (2006)
Sleep Through the Static (2008)
To the Sea (2010)
From Here to Now to You (2013)
All the Light Above It Too (2017)
Meet the Moonlight (2022)

Filmography

List of awards and nominations received

See also 
List of singer-songwriters

References

External links 

An Interview with G Love by The Mary Jane Experience

1975 births
Living people
20th-century American singers
21st-century American singers
American acoustic guitarists
American male guitarists
American film score composers
American folk guitarists
American folk singers
American male singer-songwriters
American philanthropists
Record producers from Hawaii
American rock guitarists
American rock singers
American rock songwriters
American surfers
Brit Award winners
Brushfire Records artists
American documentary film directors
University of California, Santa Barbara alumni
20th-century American guitarists
21st-century American guitarists
Guitarists from Hawaii
American male film score composers
20th-century American male singers
21st-century American male singers
Third Man Records artists
Universal Records artists
Singer-songwriters from Hawaii